was a Japanese actor.

Personal life

On January 23, 2011, Kubodera announced at his 15th anniversary fan meeting that he had been married to actress Hiroko Ōmori since 2007.

Death
On November 13, 2020, shortly after noon, Kubodera was found unresponsive at his home in Nakano, Tokyo and was taken to a hospital, where he was pronounced dead. The cause of his death is believed to be suicide.

Filmography

Television

Theater

References

External links
  

1977 births
2020 deaths
2020 suicides
Suicides in Tokyo
20th-century Japanese male actors
21st-century Japanese male actors
Japanese male film actors
Japanese male television actors
Japanese male stage actors
Male actors from Tokyo